Sarah Cornett-Ching (born May 8, 1991) is a Canadian professional stock car racing driver. She most recently competed full-time in the ARCA Menards Series, driving the No. 2 Chevrolet/Toyota for the RACE 101 team in 2015 and 2016. Since then, she has been without a ride in any NASCAR series.

Racing career
Cornett-Ching started her motorsports career at the age of twelve.

Cornett-Ching replaced Thomas Praytor full-time in the No. 2 Chevrolet for RACE 101Motorsports in 2015, after Praytor left the team to form his own team, Max Force Racing. Her entry was fielded throughout the season in a partnership between Tony Blanchard's team, RACE 101 and Hixson Motorsports. The entry was a RACE 101 car but they utilized Wayne Hixson's team owners points. Blanchard had previously partnered with Hixson the prior year on Hixson's other car, the No. 3, with rookie Karl Weber.

Her seventh-place finish in the 2015 ARCA standings put her tied with Steve Arpin (who also finished seventh in 2009) as the second highest-finishing points finish by a Canadian driver in the history of the ARCA Series, behind Jerry Churchill's three top-10 points finishes of seventh, fifth, and third in the late 1980's. Cornett-Ching also set another record that year earning the highest-ever points standings finish by a female in the series. Natalie Decker would tie this record in 2018.

In addition to competing full-time in ARCA in 2015, she also made her NASCAR K&N Pro Series East debut at Bristol, driving for Shayne Lockhart and Sam Hunt's DRIVE Technology team. RACE 101 also helped the team out for that race.

In September 2016, Cornett-Ching had a concussion while competing at Kentucky Speedway during the 2016 ARCA Racing Series. She resumed racing in March 2017 at a race in North Carolina.

Personal life
She was born in Penticton, British Columbia and as of 2011, was living in Kelowna. Some of her hobbies include longboarding, snowboarding, dirt biking, and camping.

Motorsports career results

NASCAR
(key) (Bold – Pole position awarded by qualifying time. Italics – Pole position earned by points standings or practice time. * – Most laps led.)

K&N Pro Series East

Canadian Tire Series

 Season still in progress
 Ineligible for series points

ARCA Racing Series
(key) (Bold – Pole position awarded by qualifying time. Italics – Pole position earned by points standings or practice time. * – Most laps led.)

References

External links
 

Living people
1991 births
NASCAR drivers
ARCA Menards Series drivers
Canadian female racing drivers
Racing drivers from British Columbia
Sportspeople from Penticton